Alan Weinberger is an American educator, entrepreneur, lawyer, and businessman. He is the founder, CEO and chairman of The ASCII Group, an independent organization of information technology (IT) solution providers, integrators, managed service providers (MSP) and value added resellers (VAR) that represents more than 2,000 American and Canadian computer re-sellers.

Education
Weinberger received his bachelor's degree and Juris Doctor from New York University and his Master of Laws from Harvard.

Career
Weinberger served as a founding professor at the Vermont Law School in 1973. In 1984, Weinberger founded the ASCII Group. In 1989, Weinberger began working with Soviet Ministry of Foreign Economic Relations to create academic programs in which Western management and marketing strategies were taught to high level Soviet managers. Weinberger founded the IT information portal, TechnologyNet, Inc., in 1995.

In 2012, Weinberger was announced as an executive producer for the film Mary Mother of Christ.

References

External links
Alan Weinberger Distinguished Alumni Speakers Series Video

Year of birth missing (living people)
Living people
Vermont Law and Graduate School faculty
New York University alumni
Harvard Law School alumni
American technology chief executives